Events from the year 1966 in Iran.

Incumbents
 Shah: Mohammad Reza Pahlavi 
 Prime Minister: Amir-Abbas Hoveida

Events

Births

 12 September – Anousheh Ansari.
 Roya Hakakian.

See also
 Years in Iraq
 Years in Afghanistan

References

 
Iran
Years of the 20th century in Iran
1960s in Iran
Iran